Jamie Campbell (born 28 May 2001) is a Scottish rugby union player for Edinburgh in the United Rugby Championship. Campbell's primary position is lock.

Rugby Union career

Professional career

Campbell was named in the Edinburgh academy for the 2021–22 season. He made his Edinburgh debut on 4 March in the Round 12 match of the 2021–22 United Rugby Championship against .

External links
itsrugby Profile

References

2001 births
Living people
Edinburgh Rugby players
Rugby union locks
Scottish rugby union players